William Bradshaw (10 April 1671 – 16 December 1732) was a Welsh churchman, who in the course of his career served as Dean of Christ Church, Oxford, and Bishop of Bristol.

Life
Bradshaw was born at Abergavenny in Monmouthshire on 10 April 1671. He was educated at New College, Oxford, taking his degree of B.A. on 14 April 1697, and proceeding M.A. 14 January 1700. He was ordained deacon 4 June 1699, and priest 26 May 1700, and was a senior preacher of the university in 1711.

On 5 November 1714, when he was chaplain to Charles Trimnell, Bishop of Norwich, he published a sermon preached in St Paul's Cathedral. He was appointed vicar of the rural village of Fawley, a prebend of Canterbury, in Berkshire, on 21 March 1717, which he resigned on his appointment as canon of Christ Church, Oxford, on 24 May 1723. He received the degree of D.D. on 27 August of the same year; and on 29 August 1724 was nominated and appointed to the deanery of Christ Church and the bishopric of Bristol, receiving the two preferments in commendam. He published in 1730 a Sermon preached before the House of Lords on 30 Jan. 1729-30. Bradshaw died at Bath on 16 December 1732, and was buried in Bristol Cathedral.

References

1671 births
1732 deaths
Bishops of Bristol
Deans of Christ Church, Oxford
18th-century Church of England bishops